Scherzi a parte is a  hidden camera-practical joke television series aired in prime time from  9 February 1992, first on Italia 1 and then on Canale 5.

The show is characterized by having national and international celebrities as victims. Over the years the show was criticized as some of the pranks appeared to be arranged with the victims. Several practical jokes, including Adriano Celentano's, Giancarlo Giannini's, Claudio Cecchetto's and Alessandro Benvenuti's, were never broadcast because the victims did not sign any agreement for the airing.

Editions

Victims 

  Giorgio Faletti
  Enrica Bonaccorti
  Enrico Brignano
  Iva Zanicchi
  Claudio Amendola
  Daniele Formica
  Cristina D'Avena
  Evaristo Beccalossi
  Claudia Mori
  Vittorio Sgarbi
  Lamberto Sposini
  Alessandro Gassmann
  Diego Abatantuono
  Enrico Mentana
  Leo Gullotta
  Anita Ekberg
  Brigitte Nielsen
  Moana Pozzi
  Faye Dunaway
  Gigi Sabani
  Valeria Marini
  Katia Ricciarelli
  Lina Wertmuller
  Fiorella Pierobon
  Roberto Vecchioni
  Ottaviano Del Turco
  Sergio Vastano
  Maurizio Fondriest
  Raimondo Vianello
  Sandra Mondaini
  Carol Alt
  George Weah
  Anna Falchi
  Santi Licheri
  Maria Grazia Cucinotta
  Alain Delon
  Emilio Fede
  Gene Gnocchi
  Alessandro Checchi Paone
  Carlo Verdone
  Mara Venier
  Bud Spencer
  Fabrizio Ravanelli
  Elenoire Casalegno
  Raz Degan
  Wendy Windham
  Raoul Bova
  Gianluigi Buffon
  Marco Liorni
  Eddie Irvine
  Claudio Bisio
  Jean-Claude Van Damme
  Fabio Cannavaro
  Ellen Hidding
  Natasha Stefanenko
  Didi Leoni
  Barbara De Rossi
  Antonella Clerici
  Pippo Franco
  Laura Pausini
  Elena Sofia Ricci
  Walter Zenga
  Nancy Brilli
  Fiona May
  Luca Laurenti
  Nathalie Caldonazzo
  Kristian Ghedina
  Gabriel Garko
  Paola Barale
  Demo Morelli
  Ivana Trump
  Al Bano
  Max Biaggi
  Cesare Cremonini
  Flavio Briatore
  Manuela Arcuri
  Nina Moric
  Giovanni Rana
  Alba Parietti
  Massimo Boldi
  Carlton Myers
  Irene Grandi
  Flavia Vento
  Pino Insegno
  Natalia Estrada
  Vincenzo Salemme
  Tosca D'Aquino
  Mohammed Kallon
  Simona Ventura
  Daniele Bossari
  Amanda Lear
  Arrigo Sacchi
  Eva Grimaldi
  Francesca Rettondini
  Miriana Trevisan
  Afef
  Alberto Castagna
  Jury Chechi
  Pietro Taricone
  Stefania Orlando
  Maddalena Corvaglia
  Gigi D'Alessio
  Alessandro Preziosi
  Isolde Kostner
  Gennaro Gattuso
  Cristina Parodi
  Laura Freddi
  Serse Cosmi
  Samantha De Grenet
  Randi Ingerman
  Gary Dourdan
  Martina Stella
  Maria De Filippi
  Luca Barbareschi
  Anna Valle
  Adriana Volpe
  Rocco Siffredi
  Giuliana De Sio
  Joaquin Cortes
  Paolo Brosio
  Dario Vergassola
  Federica Panicucci
  Marcus Schenkenberg
  Stefano Bettarini
  Elisabetta Canalis
  Megan Gale
  Kevin Costner
  Rossella Brescia
  Dustin Hoffman
  Selen
  Jane Alexander
  Daniel Ducruet
  Emanuela Folliero
  Katherine Kelly Lang
  Walter Nudo
  Ilary Blasi
  Federica Fontana
  Aida Yespica
  Alessia Marcuzzi
  Alena Seredova
  Anna Tatangelo
  Monica Vanali
  Roberta Capua
  Ainett Stephens
  Alessandra Mussolini
  Victoria Silvstedt
  Sabrina Ferilli
  Vladimir Luxuria
  Ilaria D'Amico
  Vanessa Incontrada
  Asia Argento
  Mickey Rourke
  Gerard Depardieu
  Clemente Russo
  Andrew Howe
  Barbara D'Urso
  Gioele Dix
  Dejan Stankovic
  Kaspar Capparoni
  Laura Torrisi
  Ezequiel Lavezzi
  Edwige Fenech
  Rupert Everett
  Serena Autieri
  Sergio Assisi
  Juliana Moreira
  Fabrizio Corona
  Ronn Moss
  Lory Del Santo
  Antonio Razzi
  Francesca Cipriani
  Mario Giordano
  Dayane Mello
  Giulia Salemi
  Antonio Zequila
  Elettra Lamborghini
  Nicola Porro
  Rocco Siffredi
  Massimo Giletti
  Giorgio Mastrota

References

1992 Italian television series debuts
Italian television shows
1990s Italian television series
2000s Italian television series
2010s Italian television series
Hidden camera television series
Canale 5 original programming
Italia 1 original programming